Sandra Perković (born 21 June 1990) is a Croatian discus thrower. She is a two-time Olympic (2012, 2016) and World (2013, 2017) champion and record six-time European champion (2010, 2012, 2014, 2016, 2018, 2022) which no other female athlete achieved. She is a six-time Diamond League overall winner.

Perković culminated her successful junior career by winning gold at the 2009 European Junior Championships with a new national record. A month later, she made the final of the World Championships as the youngest discus thrower in the field.

In her first year of senior competition she won gold at the 2010 European Championships, becoming the youngest ever European champion in women's discus throw. A six-month doping suspension after testing positive for a banned psychostimulant kept her out of competition for most of the 2011 season, including the World Championships, but she successfully defended her title in the European Championships.

Perković is coached by Edis Elkasević. Her personal best and national record is 71.41 meters, set in July 2017 at the Galà dei Castelli meeting in Bellinzona, Switzerland. At the time, it was the longest discus throw by a female athlete in 25 years.

She became a member of the Croatian Parliament after the 2015 general election for the 8th Sabor.

Early life and junior career
Perković started with athletics in the second grade of elementary school, and also played basketball and volleyball. By the 6th grade, athletics prevailed and Perković concentrated on shot put and discus throw. In 2001, she joined the Dinamo-Zrinjevac athletics club. Since 2004 she has been coached by former Olympic shot putter Ivan Ivančić, who recognized her talent in discus throw. In her first year with the new coach, she improved her personal best from 32 to over 50 meters, as Ivančić had predicted.

First successes in discus throw came in 2006. In her first major competition, the 2006 World Junior Championships, Perković failed to make the final, but became a regular international medalist thereafter, winning silver medals in both the World Youth Championships and the European Junior Championships in 2007, and a bronze in the 2008 World Junior Championships. She was ranked 5th in the 2008 junior world list with 55.89 m.

Perković suffered a very serious setback in early 2009, after doctors misdiagnosed her appendicitis. Her appendix burst after three days, which caused a near-fatal sepsis that required two emergency surgeries and a lengthy recovery. She lost  of body weight in the process and was initially not expected to return to full training before the end of the year.

However, Perković resumed training after a three-month break, and returned to competition by winning the discus throw gold medal at the European Athletics Junior Championships in Novi Sad in July 2009, where she set a new national record with a 62.44 m throw, and also met the A standard for the World Championships. Her performance was the best in the European Junior Championships for 20 years, with a winning margin of 7 meters and 33 centimeters, the largest in the history of the Championships. Her other two legal marks in the final would also have been sufficient for the gold.

A month later, she placed 9th at her first major senior competition, the 2009 World Championships in Athletics, as the youngest discus thrower in the field, including the qualifiers. Later in the year she improved the national record to 62.79 m. Her throws ultimately captured top eleven spots in the 2009 junior discus throw world list.

Following her successful 2009 season, she was named by the SPIKES magazine as one of "ten rising stars to watch in 2010", and received the Croatian Olympic Committee's Dražen Petrović Award as the most promising Croatian female athlete in 2009.

Senior career
At the Croatian Winter Throws Championship held on 6 March 2010 in Split, Perković massively improved her personal best to 66.85 m, setting a 2010 world leading mark and surpassing the 2009 world best of 66.40 m, set by Li Yanfeng. On the same day, Perković set her outdoor personal best in shot put, at 16.02 m. She continued her strong throwing by taking gold in the under-23 section of the women's discus at the European Cup Winter Throwing meeting in Arles; her winning mark of 61.93 m would have been enough for silver in the senior competition.

In June, Perković took gold in both discus throw and shot put in the Second League of the 2010 European Team Championships, helping her national team move up into the First League competition in 2011.

Perković's good form in 2010 culminated at the European Championships in Barcelona, where she won a gold medal in discus throw. Perković struggled in the qualification and was even close to elimination as she failed to make the qualifying norm of 60.00 m, placing only 10th out of 12 athletes to advance to the final. However, in the final she made a strong opening round throw which kept her in silver medal position until the last, 6th round, when she made a winning throw of 64.67 m, becoming the youngest ever European champion in women's discus throw.

In the IAAF Diamond League final at Memorial van Damme in Brussels, Perković won with the new national record of 66.93 m, and finished her first Diamond League season in second place overall, after Yarelis Barrios. Shortly after her victory at the Hanžeković Memorial in Zagreb on 1 September, Perković concluded the 2010 season by winning silver at the IAAF Continental Cup in Split. European Athletics recognised her senior breakthrough year by giving her the European Athletics Rising Star of the Year award.

In February 2011 Perković won the discus throw at the Croatian Winter Throws Championship in Split and further improved her national record to 67.96 m. In the same competition she also set the national record in shot put, at 16.40 m. Just days later, Perković suffered a back injury that forced her to miss the European Cup Winter Throwing in March. She returned to competition in May by winning the Diamond League discus throw event in Shanghai.

Doping suspension
In June 2011 it was announced that Perković had failed two doping tests conducted in the month before at the Diamond League meetings in Rome and Shanghai. She tested positive for methylhexanamine, a psychostimulant banned by the World Anti-Doping Agency since 2010. Perković stated that the positive results were due to Nox Pump, an American-made energy drink product she had been using without knowing it contained banned substances. She did not request an analysis of her B-sample.

The Croatian Athletics Federation "recognized that Perkovic had no intention to take nor was aware of taking a stimulant" and gave her a six-month suspension, later confirmed by the IAAF. In accordance with the IAAF rules, all marks set after her first positive test were annulled, including the mark of 69.99 m set on 4 June 2011 in Varaždin, despite the fact that she tested negative in that competition. The 69.99 m mark would have been the best in the world in the last twelve years. The suspension ran until 7 December, keeping Perković out of competition for the rest of the 2011 season, including the World Championships.

2012 season
She returned from her ban in 2012 and continued to throw well: she won the under-23 section at the 2012 European Cup Winter Throwing, set a national record of 68.24 m at the Shanghai Golden Grand Prix, then broke the meet record at the Prefontaine Classic in June. By surpassing the Olympic A standard of 62.00 m, Perković qualified for the 2012 Summer Olympics.

In the European Championships in Helsinki, Perković's main rival was Nadine Müller of Germany, the 2011 World Championships silver medalist and the 2012 world leading discus thrower with 68.89 m. After successfully qualifying, Perković found herself in serious trouble in the final after posting two no-throws. Under pressure, she threw 67.62 m in the third round, which ultimately proved too good for Müller and the rest of the field, and gave Perković her second European title.

At the 2012 Summer Olympics Perković won the gold medal with a new national record of 69.11 m.

2013 season
Perković backed up her Olympic victory by winning the 2013 World Championship in Moscow.

2014 season
In 2014, she completed the triple of major championships winning the 2014 European Championship with another personal best of 71.08m in Zurich.  Two weeks later, in the same Zurich stadium, Perković completed the 2014 Diamond League season with another win on the same day her original coach Ivan Ivančić died.

2015 season
In 2015, Perković took silver in the 2015 World Championships with her final round effort.

2016 season
In 2016, Perkovic completed a perfect season winning all eleven competitions she entered, including the Olympic Games and European Championships.

Her Olympic title was won with her one successful throw (her third-round effort following two fouls and before three subsequent fouls), a distance of 69.21 m – 2 metres further than any other thrower achieved.

2017 season
2017 saw another near perfect season with nine out of eleven wins in all competitions including the World Championships in London.

Just before the World Championships she threw a national record of 71.41 m, the world-leading throw for that year and the longest in 25 years.

2018 season
2018 was another successful season with Perković winning the European Championships and losing only twice. However, those two losses were in the Diamond League Final and the IAAF Continental Cup. At 2018 Paavo Nurmi games, Perković had a friendly arm wrestling challenge with a Finnish discus thrower and a fellow competitor Sanna Kämäräinen and Perković won the arm wrestling.

2019 season
This season saw Perković’s world dominance end with bronze at the 2019 World Championships behind the Cuban pair of Yaime Perez and Denia Caballero.

Perković never equalled the distances of the previous few seasons, only winning three of the nine finals she competed in.

2020 season
2020 was a quiet season but Perković did win a couple of competitions in her native Croatia.

2021 season
Perković finished outside the medals in 4th place at the postponed 2020 Tokyo Olympics.

2022 season
Perković returned to form, first taking silver at the 2022 World Championships,  then winning the  2022 European Championships,  making her the first athlete ever to win six individual titles at the European Athletics Championships.

Results in international competitions
Note: Only the position and distance in the final are indicated, unless otherwise stated. (q) means the athlete did not qualify for the final, with the overall position and distance in the qualification round indicated.

Political career
Perković was a candidate at the 2015 general election in which she stood for the social democratic Milan Bandić 365 - The Party of Labour and Solidarity as second on the party list for the 2nd electoral district. The party gained one seat from the electoral district but since the list leader, who was Mayor of Zagreb Milan Bandić himself, did not take his seat due to incompatibility of the positions of mayor and MP, Perković became a member of the Croatian Parliament and took the oath of office at the first session. However, she did not participate in the work of the Parliament since she didn't come to a single session besides the first, constitutive one. Her term ended on 15 July 2016 with Parliament's self-dissolution which triggered extraordinary parliamentary election. During this term, Perković served as a member of the Parliament's Committee on the Family, Youth and Sports.

Personal life
Perković is a devout Roman Catholic. She speaks Croatian and English fluently and has basic understanding of Italian.

References

External links

 
 
 
 
 
 

Olympic gold medalists for Croatia
Olympic athletes of Croatia
21st-century Croatian women
20th-century Croatian women
Living people
1990 births
Croatian female discus throwers
Croatian female shot putters
Croatian sportsperson-politicians
Sportspeople from Zagreb
Representatives in the modern Croatian Parliament
Doping cases in athletics
Croatian sportspeople in doping cases
Athletes (track and field) at the 2012 Summer Olympics
Athletes (track and field) at the 2016 Summer Olympics
European Athletics Championships winners
Medalists at the 2012 Summer Olympics
Medalists at the 2016 Summer Olympics
World Athletics Championships medalists
World Athletics Championships athletes for Croatia
Olympic gold medalists in athletics (track and field)
Mediterranean Games gold medalists for Croatia
Athletes (track and field) at the 2013 Mediterranean Games
Olympic female discus throwers
European Athletics Rising Star of the Year winners
Mediterranean Games medalists in athletics
World Athletics Championships winners
Diamond League winners
Athletes (track and field) at the 2020 Summer Olympics